Risa Saraswati (born 24 February 1985) is an Indonesian singer, songwriter and author from Sundanese descent. She was a former lead singer and a founding member of now-defunct Indonesian indie pop group, Homogenic (later known as HMGNC). In 2009, Saraswati announced her resignation as the band's lead singer to form a new band, Sarasvati. In 2012, she writes her debut best-selling book, Danur which spawned three film adaptations.

Music career
Saraswati began involved with music since high school and after graduated, she became seriously active in music. In 2002, Saraswati along with her schoolmate, Dina Dellyana formed Homogenic (named after Swedish singer Bjork's 1997 album of the same name; renamed HMGNC in 2015), where she took the role as lead singer and Dina playing keyboards and composed music. Grahadea Kusuf joined the band afterwards, wherein he playing synth and composed songs, thus completing the band as a trio. Saraswati produced two albums with the band: Epic Symphony (2004) and Echoes of the Universe (2006).

She left the band in October 2009 after seven years together and formed her own band, Sarasvati which performs gospel music and has produced five studio albums with the band. In 2017, Saraswati reunited with HMGNC when the band released their eponymous fourth studio album.

Writing career
As a writer, Saraswati mostly focused on horror fiction in her works and widely known for writing mystical stories. In January 2012, she released her debut book, titled Danur containing 214 pages. The success of Danur led to its three film adaptations, wherein Saraswati credited as a screenplay writer.

In January 2020, Jurnal Risa: Teror Liburan Sekolah, a children's story book written by Saraswati, was published.

Personal life
Saraswati married Dimas Tri "Dimasta" Adityo on 15 February 2019. Their first child, Anaking Raga Janari, was born on 15 January 2020.

Discography

Homogenic
 Epic Symphony (2004)
 Echoes of the Universe (2006)

Sarasvati
 Story of Peter (2011)
 Mirror (2012)
 Sunyaruri (2013)
 Ballades (2015)
 Ratimaya (2015)

Filmography

As screenwriter
 Danur (2017)
 Danur 2: Maddah (2018)
 Danur 3: Sunyaruri (2019)

References

External links
 
 

1985 births
Living people
Sundanese people
Indonesian Muslims
People from Bandung
21st-century Indonesian women singers
Indonesian songwriters
Indonesian writers
Indonesian people of Malay descent